Craig Douglas Caskey (born December 11, 1949) is a former Major League Baseball pitcher.

Career
Caskey attended Lake Washington High School and the University of Puget Sound. He was drafted four times, first by the Houston Astros in the 1969 January Draft. He did not sign. In 1971, the San Francisco Giants selected Caskey in the 10th round of the draft. He again did not sign. In 1972, he was drafted twice, first in the January draft by the California Angels, then in the first round of the June Secondary draft by the Montreal Expos. He signed with Montreal and played for both the West Palm Beach Expos and the Jamestown Falcons in 1972.

He began the 1973 season with the Peninsula Whips of the International League. He was called up to the major leagues in July, and made his debut on July 19. Montreal faced the Cincinnati Reds at Riverfront Stadium. Bill Stoneman, the Expos' starting pitcher in the game pitched only 2.1 innings, and Caskey relieved him. He pitched 4.2 innings, faced 16 hitters, and allowed only one hit and one base on balls. He also recorded a strikeout. The Reds won the game 3–2. Caskey would pitch in nine major league games in 1973, finishing with a 5.65 earned run average, six strikeouts, and four walks in 14⅓ innings pitched. He also had one at bat, recording a sacrifice bunt, and a run scored.

Caskey pitched for the Memphis Blues in 1974, and would pitch in the Pittsburgh Pirates organization in 1975.

Sources

External links
, or Retrosheet, or Pelota Binaria (Venezuelan Winter League)

1949 births
Living people
Algodoneros de Unión Laguna players
American expatriate baseball players in Canada
American expatriate baseball players in Mexico
Baseball players from California
Cardenales de Lara players
American expatriate baseball players in Venezuela
Charleston Charlies players
Jamestown Falcons players
Major League Baseball pitchers
Memphis Blues players
Mexican League baseball pitchers
Montreal Expos players
Peninsula Whips players
Puget Sound Loggers baseball players
Shreveport Captains players
Sportspeople from Visalia, California
West Palm Beach Expos players
Alaska Goldpanners of Fairbanks players